Walter Konarski (July 4, 1929 – August 26, 2010) was a Canadian football player who played for the Winnipeg Blue Bombers. He previously played for the Winnipeg Light Infantry.

References

1929 births
2010 deaths